Nacoleia syngenica is a moth in the family Crambidae. It was described by Turner in 1913. It is found in Australia, where it has been recorded from Queensland. base. The lines are dark-fuscous.

References

Moths described in 1913
Nacoleia
Moths of Australia